Fatal Care: Survive in the U.S. Health System is a book about preventable medical errors written by Sanjaya Kumar, president and chief medical officer of Quantros, Milpitas, California. Fatal Care was published in April 2008 by IGI Publishing, Minneapolis, Minnesota.

Fatal Care: Survive in the U.S. Health System describes the impact of preventable medical errors on thirteen families. Topics covered include: heparin overdose, misdiagnosis, hospital-acquired infection, patient-controlled analgesia (PCA) pump, medically induced trauma, inadequate emergency department care, and wrong site surgery. Fatal Care identifies gaps in the health care system based on documented factual information and analysis for health care consumers and professionals.

According to Institute of Medicine (IOM) and Institute for Healthcare Improvement (IHI), as many as 98,000 patient deaths occur each year in U.S. healthcare facilities as a result of preventable medical errors. Also, IOM and IHI report preventable medical errors impact at least five million Americans annually, costing more than $17–21 billion.

Well-publicized preventable medical error cases involve celebrities Dennis Quaid, Terry Francona and Charlie Weis.

See also
Diagnosis
Medical ethics
The Deadly Dinner Party
How Doctors Think
To Err is Human

References
 "Dennis Quaid files suit over drug mishap" Ornstein, Charles., Los Angeles Times, 5 December 2007
 "Pembroke story featured in book on medical errors" Patriot Ledger, 15 April 2008, Schwartz, Sidney
 "Quantros to Sponsor MITSS HOPE Award", Tobin, Winifred N. MITSS (Medically Induced Trauma Support Services), Press Room
 "Star QB testifies in Weis case" Abraham, Yvonne, Boston.com, 17, February 2007
 "Strike Out Infection" Francona, Terry.
 
 PBS's Nightly Business Report Transcript, 4 April 2007
 The Quality Colloquium, Harvard University, August 2007
 "Pay-for-Performance: A Guide for Hospital Trustees" for American Hospital Association, Center For Healthcare Governance, Kumar, Sanjaya

Medical books
Patient safety